Robert George Hirst (born 3 September 1955) is an Australian musician from Camden, New South Wales. He is a founding member of rock band Midnight Oil on drums, percussion and backing vocals (sometimes lead vocals) from the 1970s until the band took a hiatus in 2002. The band resumed activity as a group in 2017. Hirst also wrote a book, Willie's Bar & Grill, recounting the experiences on the tour Midnight Oil embarked on shortly after the 11 September terrorist attacks in 2001.

The Midnight Oil Years (1976–2002, 2017–present)

In the early 1970s schoolboys Rob Hirst and close friends Jim Moginie and Andrew "Bear" James played their first public performance in a school hall in Sydney's leafy northern suburbs under the name Schwampy Moose playing mainly Beatles covers. By 1976 the band had changed their name to Farm, and Hirst, now a student at University of Sydney (BA/LLB), placed an advertisement in The Sydney Morning Herald for a singer to join the trio. The new line up of Peter Garrett (lead vocals), Hirst (drums and vocals), Moginie (guitar, keyboards, backing vocals), and James (bass guitar) was joined soon after by Martin Rotsey on guitar and their manager and sixth member Gary Morris. The band changed their name to Midnight Oil.

With a blistering intensity to their live performances, the band's early music was a unique brand of surf punk. However, by the early 1980s the key songwriters in the band, Hirst, Moginie, and Garrett, had become increasingly interested in the political issues of the day. This had a significant influence on their song writing and soon spilled over into their live performances as the dynamic and outspoken Garrett used the stage as a platform for the band's views on issues including Aboriginal rights, nuclear disarmament and social justice.

In 1979 James left to be replaced by Peter Gifford. In 1987, after touring the outback and recording the band's best-known album Diesel and Dust, Gifford suffered ill health and resigned. New bass player Bones Hillman (formerly of New Zealand band The Swingers) brought a new vocal dimension to the band. Midnight Oil continued to record and tour internationally for a further 15 years, chalking up a final tally of fourteen albums and two extended plays before lead singer Garrett quit the group in December 2002, taking up a career in politics. The band have resumed activity as of 2017, including undertaking a 2017 world tour.

Side projects and post-Midnight Oil

Ghostwriters

In the mid-1990s, while Midnight Oil were taking a break, Hirst joined up with guitarist Andrew Dickson and Hoodoo Gurus bass guitarist Rick Grossman to form a side project, Ghostwriters. So far, the band has released four albums, Ghostwriters (Virgin Records, 1991), Second Skin (Mercury Records, 1996), Fibromoon (self-released, 2000), and Political Animal (SonyBMG Australia, 2007).

Backsliders
In the year 2000, Hirst joined Backsliders, an Australian Blues group formed in 1986 whose members include founding member Dom Turner and harmonica players Brod Smith, Ian Collard and Joe Glover. The line-up with Hirst has released six studio albums, one EP and a live DVD.

Other musical projects
Turner and Hirst formed another band in 2002, the Angry Tradesmen, with the idea of taking the guitar/drum music of North Mississippi and blending it with drum/bass music of the 1990s and experimental post-punk rock. Their only album Beat the House was released in 2008 and featured studio performances by Midnight Oil's Martin Rotsey. Hirst and Rotsey also play on the track "All Around the World" on Jim Moginie's 2006 solo album Alas Folkloric.

Other musical collaborations have included working with Australia's Olympic athletes on a record commissioned by SOCOG for the Sydney 2000 Olympics, and an unrelated collaboration with former Olympic athlete, Paul Greene. Hirst and Greene have released an album, In the Stealth of Summer, and a DVD, Hirst and Greene - Live at the Basement.

In 2010 Hirst, Moginie and Rotsey teamed up with Violent Femmes bass player Brian Ritchie and Hunters & Collectors trumpet player Jack Howard to form a new surf rock band, The Break. Their debut album, Church of the Open Sky, was released on 16 April 2010 on the independent label Bombora, distributed by MGM. A tour of Australia followed. Their second album, "Space Farm", was released on 15 March 2013, again followed by an Australian tour.

In 2015, Hirst collaborated on music with his eldest daughter Jay O'Shea of the band O'Shea. Hirst had given Jay up for adoption at a young age and it was through her birth mother and Rob's bandmate from Midnight Oil Bones Hillman that the two eventually connected. The song The Truth Walks Slowly is the second time Rob has collaborated with his children after previously having his younger two daughters complete backing vocals on his solo album.

Personal life
Hirst has three daughters. He has two daughters with his wife, Leslie Holland. One of his daughters, Gabriella Hirst, is an artist. He also has another daughter, Jay O'Shea, who was born to a former girlfriend and was later adopted. They reunited in 2010 and have subsequently collaborated.

Discography

Albums

See also
 Midnight Oil
 Ghostwriters
 Backsliders

Awards and nominations

APRA Awards 
These annual awards were established by Australasian Performing Right Association (APRA) in 1982 to honour the achievements of songwriters and music composers and to recognise their song writing skills, sales and airplay performance, by its members annually. From 1982 to 1990, the best songs were given the Gold Award (also called the Special Award).

|-
|  1989–90 ||  "Beds Are Burning" (Peter Garrett, Robert Hirst, James Moginie) || Gold Award || 
|-
| rowspan="2"| 2001 || "Beds Are Burning" (Garrett, Hirst, Moginie) || APRA Top 10 Australian songs || 
|-
| "Power and the Passion" (Hirst, Moginie, Garrett) || APRA Top 30 Australian songs || 
|-
| 2018 || Midnight Oil (Garrett, Hirst, Martin Rotsey, Moginie, Bones Hillman) || Ted Albert Award for Outstanding Services to Australian Music || 
|-
| 2021 || "Gadigal Land" (Joel Davison, Rob Hirst, Bunna Lawrie) || Song of the Year || 
|-
| 2022 || "First Nation" || Song of the Year || 
|-

Country Music Awards of Australia
The Country Music Awards of Australia is an annual awards night held in January during the Tamworth Country Music Festival. Celebrating recording excellence in the Australian country music industry. They commenced in 1973.
 (wins only)
! 
|-
| 2017 || "The Truth Walks Slowly (In The Country Side)" O'Shea featuring Rob Hirst|| Video of the Year ||  || 
|}

References

General
  Note: Archived on-line copy has limited functionality.
  Note: on-line version established at White Room Electronic Publishing Pty Ltd in 2007 and was expanded from the 2002 edition.
Specific

External links
Rob Hirst website
Midnight Oil website
The Ghostwriters website
The Ghostwriters on MySpace
The Backsliders website
The Angry Tradesmen website
Hirst and Greene website
The Break website

1955 births
Living people
APRA Award winners
Australian rock drummers
Male drummers
Midnight Oil members
People educated at Sydney Grammar School